This is a list of notable events in music that took place in the year 1957.

Specific locations
1957 in British music
1957 in Norwegian music

Specific genres
1957 in country music
1957 in jazz

Events
 January 5 – Renato Carosone and his band start their American tour in Cuba.
 January 6 – Elvis Presley makes his final appearance on The Ed Sullivan Show.
 January 16 – The Cavern Club opens in Liverpool, England, as a jazz club.
 February 8 – Bo Diddley records his songs "Hey! Bo Diddley" and "Mona (I Need You Baby)".
 March – Chicago's Cardinal Stritch bans all rock and roll and rhythm and blues music from Catholic-run schools, saying that "its rhythms encourage young people to behave in a hedonistic manner."
 March 1 – The Everly Brothers record in Nashville their first single "Bye Bye Love" for Cadence Records.
 March 3 – The second annual Eurovision Song Contest is staged in Frankfurt am Main, West Germany. The contest is won by Dutch singer Corry Brokken with the song Net als toen.
 March 19 – Elvis Presley purchases a mansion in Memphis, Tennessee, and calls it Graceland.
 March 26 – Ricky Nelson records his first three songs.
 March 27 – "Que Sera, Sera (Whatever Will Be, Will Be)" from 1956's Alfred Hitchcock suspense film The Man Who Knew Too Much wins the Academy Award for Best Song. Sung by Doris Day in the film, it proves to be one of her biggest hit records as well.
 May 14 – In Paris, Heitor Villa-Lobos records his Bachiana Brasileira No. 4, with the Orchestre Nationale de la Radiodiffusion Française, for EMI. Through May 21 the recording sessions continue with Bachiana Brasileira No. 7 and Bachiana Brasileira No. 3 with Manoel Braune, piano.
 May 26 – Paul Robeson, blacklisted at this time from travelling outside the United States, performs a concert from New York City via the new transatlantic telephone line to an audience in St Pancras Town Hall in London; on October 5 he uses the same means to address the Miners' Eisteddfod at the Grand Pavilion, Porthcawl in Wales.
 June 20 – Tōru Takemitsu's Requiem for Strings is first performed, by the Tokyo Symphony Orchestra.
 July 6 – John Lennon and Paul McCartney of The Beatles first meet at a garden fete at St. Peter's Church, Woolton, Liverpool, England, at which Lennon's skiffle group, The Quarrymen, is playing (and in the graveyard of which an Eleanor Rigby is buried).
 August 5 – American Bandstand begins its 30-year syndicated run on US network television.
 August 7 – The Quarrymen first play at The Cavern Club in Liverpool in an interlude spot between jazz bands; when John Lennon starts the group playing Elvis Presley's "Don't Be Cruel", the club's owner at this time hands him a note reading "Cut out the bloody rock 'n roll". Paul McCartney is away from Liverpool at this time at a Boy Scout camp and a family holiday.
 September 19 – Dalida is the first artist to be awarded a gold record in France for 300,000 sales of "Bambino". This year, she is also the first female recording artist to have her own fan club.
 September 20 – Jean Sibelius dies aged 91 at Ainola, his home in Finland, having completed no significant compositions for thirty years; at the time of his death, a performance of his Symphony No. 5 is being given in Helsinki under the baton of Sir Malcolm Sargent.
 September 26 – Broadway première of the musical West Side Story at the Winter Garden Theatre (following tryouts in Washington, D.C. and Philadelphia beginning in August) with music by Leonard Bernstein (who a week later is appointed music director of the New York Philharmonic orchestra) and lyrics by Stephen Sondheim, his Broadway debut. This year also Bernstein conducts the inaugural concert of the Mann Auditorium in Tel Aviv.
 November 25–27 – The first two Hollywood motion pictures starring Pat Boone, Bernadine and April Love, are released.
 Paul Simon and Art Garfunkel name themselves Tom and Jerry and begin their recording career, signing with Sid Prosen of Big Records. Their first single, "Hey, Schoolgirl", backed with "Dancin' Wild", hits #49 on the Billboard pop charts. Garfunkel is Tom Graph (so called because he like to write the pop charts out on graph paper) and Simon is Jerry Landis, a pseudonym he used during his early 1960s solo recordings. They tour for eighteen months before retiring to become college students and then reforming in 1963 as Simon & Garfunkel.
 The Casals Festival is founded in Puerto Rico.
 When Nat King Cole's television show is unable to get a sponsor, Frankie Laine becomes the first artist to cross TV's color line, becoming the first white artist to appear as a guest, foregoing his usual salary of $10,000. Other top performers follow suit, including Mel Tormé and Tony Bennett, but, despite an increase in ratings, the show still fails to pick up a national sponsor.
 Gorni Kramer makes his first appearance on Italian television, in Il Musichiere.
 Maria Callas is introduced to Greek shipping magnate Aristotle Onassis.
 "Suíte do Pescador" is composed by Dorival Caymmi.
 Actress Debbie Reynolds earns a gold record for her song Tammy, which is the best-selling single by a female vocalist in 1957 in the United States. This song from the motion picture Tammy and the Bachelor is also nominated for an Academy Award.

Bands formed
 United States Navy Steel Band

Albums released

 About the Blues – Julie London
After Glow – Carmen McRae
 After Midnight – Nat King Cole
 After School Session – Chuck Berry
 Almendra – Aldemaro Romero
 Anita Sings the Most – Anita O'Day
 April in Paris – Count Basie
 Art Pepper Meets the Rhythm Section – Art Pepper
 At Mister Kelly's – Sarah Vaughan
 At the Gate of Horn – Odetta
 Award Winner: Stan Getz – Stan Getz
 Bags' Groove – Miles Davis
 The Beat of My Heart – Tony Bennett
 Belafonte Sings of the Caribbean – Harry Belafonte
 Bing with a Beat – Bing Crosby
 The Big Beat – Johnnie Ray
 Birth of the Cool – Miles Davis
 Blossom Dearie – Blossom Dearie
 A Blowin' Session – Johnny Griffin
 Blue Starr – Kay Starr
 Blue Train – John Coltrane
 Blue Trombone – J. J. Johnson
 Boy Meets Girl – Sammy Davis Jr. and Carmen McRae
 Brilliant Corners – Thelonious Monk
 Chet Atkins at Home – Chet Atkins
 The "Chirping" Crickets – Buddy Holly & The Crickets (debut)
 A Christmas Story – Bing Crosby
 Close to You – Frank Sinatra
 A Closer Walk with Thee – Pat Boone
 The Clown – Charles Mingus
 Coltrane – John Coltrane
 Cookin' – Paul Gonsalves
 Cookin' with the Miles Davis Quintet – Miles Davis
 Count Basie at Newport – Count Basie
 Criollísima – Aldemaro Romero
 Cuban Jam Sessions in Miniature – Cachao
 Day by Night – Doris Day
 Dedicated to You – The "5" Royales
 Double Play! – Russ Freeman & André Previn
 Dream Street – Peggy Lee
Drum Suite – Art Blakey
 Ella and Louis Again – Ella Fitzgerald & Louis Armstrong
 Ella Fitzgerald Sings the Duke Ellington Song Book – Ella Fitzgerald & Duke Ellington
 Elvis' Christmas Album – Elvis Presley
 An Evening with Belafonte – Harry Belafonte
 Exotica – Martin Denny
 Gene Vincent and His Blue Caps – Gene Vincent
Grand Ole Opry's New Star – George Jones
 The Great Ray Charles – Ray Charles
Hard Bop – Art Blakely and the Jazz Messengers
The Helen Morgan Story  – Gogi Grant
 Her Nibs – Georgia Gibbs
 Here's Little Richard – Little Richard
 Hi-Fi in Focus – Chet Atkins
 Hymns We Love – Pat Boone
 I Love John Frigo...He Swings – Johnny Frigo (debut)
 In Las Vegas – Johnnie Ray
 Interplay for 2 Trumpets and 2 Tenors – John Coltrane
 It's All Over but the Swingin' – Sammy Davis Jr.
Jackie's Pal – Jackie McLean
 Jazz by Sun Ra – Sun Ra
 Jim Edward, Maxine, and Bonnie Brown – The Browns (debut)
 A Jolly Christmas from Frank Sinatra – Frank Sinatra
The Jones Boys – Thad Jones
 Julie – Julie London
Just One of Those Things – Nat King Cole
Jutta Hipp With Zoot Sims – Jutta Hipp
 Like Someone in Love – Ella Fitzgerald
 Losers, Weepers – Kay Starr
Louis and the Angels – Louis Armstrong
 Louis Armstrong Meets Oscar Peterson – Louis Armstrong & Oscar Peterson
 Love Is the Thing – Nat King Cole
 Love Serenade – Ames Brothers
 Loving You – Elvis Presley
Mad Thad – Thad Jones
 Make Love to Me – Julie London
 Mal/2 – Mal Waldron
 The Man I Love – Peggy Lee
 The Many Sides of Toshiko – Toshiko Akiyoshi
 Mating Call – Tadd Dameron
 Mel Tormé's California Suite – Mel Tormé
 Mel Tormé at the Crescendo – Mel Tormé
 Miguel – Dalida
 Miles Ahead – Miles Davis
 A Midnight Session with the Jazz Messengers – Art Blakey
 Moanin' the Blues – Hank Williams
 Monk's Music – Thelonious Monk
 Moondreams – Dick Haymes
 Mozart: Clarinet Concerto, Quintet for Clarinet and Strings. Benny Goodman, clarinet, Boston Symphony Orchestra, conducted by Charles Munch; Boston Symphony String Quartet. 12-inch LP. RCA Victor LM 2073.
 New Tricks – Bing Crosby
 Now Hear This – The Hi-Lo's
 Once Over Lightly – Jo Stafford
 One Dozen Roses – The Mills Brothers
 One O'Clock Jump – Count Basie Orchestra, Ella Fitzgerald & Joe Williams
 Orgy in Rhythm – Art Blakey
 The Pajama Game – Doris Day
 Pal Joey with Frank Sinatra
 Pat – Pat Boone
 Pat Boone Sings Irving Berlin – Pat Boone
 Patsy Cline – Patsy Cline
 Please, Please, Please – James Brown
The Poll Winners – Barney Kessel
 Porgy and Bess – Ella Fitzgerald & Louis Armstrong
The Prestige Jazz Quartet – Teddy Charles
 Pretty Baby – Dean Martin
 Quand on n'a que l'amour – Jacques Brel
 Ray Charles – Ray Charles
 Ricky – Ricky Nelson (debut)
 Ring around Rosie – The Hi-Lo's
 Rockin'  – Frankie Laine
 Rockin' the Oldies – Bill Haley & His Comets
 'Round About Midnight – Miles Davis
 Sammy Swings – Sammy Davis Jr.
 Saxophone Colossus – Sonny Rollins
 Sea Shells – Peggy Lee
 Sing a Song of Basie – Lambert, Hendricks & Ross
 Sometimes I'm Happy, Sometimes I'm Blue – Jill Corey
 Son nom est Dalida – Dalida
 Songs for Any Taste – Mel Tormé
 Songs for Inspiration & Meditation – Jo Stafford
 Songs of Scotland – Jo Stafford
Sophisticated Swing – Cannonball Adderley
 Soulville – Ben Webster
 The Sounds of Christmas Harmony – Ames Brothers
Strange Blues – Jackie McLean (recorded, released 1967)
Strictly Powell – Bud Powell
 Such Sweet Thunder – Duke Ellington
 Suddenly It's The Hi-Lo's – The Hi-Lo's
 Suddenly There's Gogi Grant – Gogi Grant
 Sweet Seventeen – Ames Brothers
 A Swingin' Affair! – Frank Sinatra
 Swingin' Easy – Sarah Vaughan
 Tenor Conclave – Prestige All Stars
 Thelonious Monk with John Coltrane – Thelonious Monk & John Coltrane
 There'll Always Be A Christmas – Ames Brothers
 Tony – Tony Bennett
 Tormé Meets the British – Mel Tormé
 Toshiko and Leon Sash at Newport – Toshiko Akiyoshi & Leon Sash
 Trane's Blues – John Coltrane
 Walkin' – Miles Davis
 Way Out West – Sonny Rollins
 We Get Letters – Perry Como
 The Weavers at Carnegie Hall – The Weavers
 West Side Story – Original Broadway Cast
 Where Are You? – Frank Sinatra
 Winner's Circle – Oscar Pettiford
 With His Hot and Blue Guitar – Johnny Cash (debut)

Biggest hit singles
The following songs achieved the highest chart positions in the charts of 1957.

US No. 1 hit singles
These singles reached the top of US Billboards charts in 1957.

Top hits on record

Published popular music

 "An Affair to Remember (Our Love Affair)"  Harold Adamson & Leo McCarey  Harry Warren
 "After School"  Dick Wolf & Warren Nadel
 "All Shook Up" w.m. Otis Blackwell & Elvis Presley
 "All the Way" w. Sammy Cahn m. Jimmy Van Heusen
 "Almost Paradise" m. Norman Petty
 "Alone (Why Must I Be Alone)" w. Selma Craft m. Morton Craft
 "America" w. Stephen Sondheim m. Leonard Bernstein
 "April Love" w. Paul Francis Webster m. Sammy Fain
 "Are You Sincere?" w.m. Wayne Walker
 "At the Hop" w.m. Artie Singer, Johnny Medora & Dave White
 "Bernardine" w.m. Johnny Mercer
 "Bony Moronie" w.m. Larry Williams
 "The Book of Love" w.m. Warren Davies, George Malone & Charles Patrick
 "Boy on a Dolphin" w.(Eng) Paul Francis Webster (Greek) Jean Fermanoglou m. Takis Morakis
 "Build Your Love (On A Strong Foundation)" O. Jones
 "Butterfly" w.m. Anthony September
 "Bye Bye Love" w.m. Felice & Boudleaux Bryant
 "Ca, C'est L'Amour" w.m. Cole Porter. Introduced by Taina Elg in the film Les Girls.
 "Catch a Falling Star" w.m. Lee Pockriss & Paul Vance
 "Chances Are" w. Al Stillman m. Robert Allen
 "Chantez, Chantez" w. Albert Gamse m. Irving Fields
 "Cocoanut Sweet" w. E. Y. Harburg m. Harold Arlen
 "Come Fly with Me" w. Sammy Cahn m. Jimmy Van Heusen
 "Come Go with Me" w.m. Clarence E. Quick
 "Cool" w. Stephen Sondheim m. Leonard Bernstein
 "Could This Be Magic" w.m. Hiram Johnson & Richard Blandon
 "Dark Moon" w.m. Ned Miller
 "The Day the Rains Came" w.(Eng) Carl Sigman (Fr) Pierre Delanoë m. Gilbert Bécaud
 "Diana" w.m. Paul Anka
 "Do I Love You Because You're Beautiful?" w. Oscar Hammerstein II m. Richard Rodgers
 "Everyday" Charles Hardin, Norman Petty
 "The First Time Ever I Saw Your Face" w.m. Ewan MacColl
 "Four Walls" w.m. George Campbell & Marvin Moore
 "From a Jack to a King" w.m. Ned Miller
 "Gee, Officer Krupke" w. Stephen Sondheim m. Leonard Bernstein from the musical West Side Story
 "Gigi" w. Alan Jay Lerner m. Frederick Loewe
 "The Girl with the Golden Braids" m. Eddie Snyder w. Stanley J. Kahan
 "Goodnight My Someone" w.m. Meredith Willson
 "Got-Ta Have Something in the Bank, Frank" Bob Hilliard, Mort Garson
 "Great Balls of Fire" w.m. Jack Hammer & Otis Blackwell
 "A Handful of Songs" Tommy Steele, Lionel Bart & Michael Pratt
 "Happy, Happy Birthday Baby" w.m. Margo Sylvia & Gilbert Lopez
 "Hey Schoolgirl" w. Art Garfunkel m. Paul Simon
 "Hula Love" adapted by Buddy Knox from the 1911 song "My Hula Hula Love"
 "I Can't Stop Loving You" w.m. Don Gibson
 "I Feel Pretty" w. Stephen Sondheim m. Leonard Bernstein
 "I Just Don't Know" w. Joe Stone m. Robert Allen
 "I Like Your Kind of Love" Melvin Endsley
 "I'm Sorry" w.m. Buck Ram
 "In My Own Little Corner" w. Oscar Hammerstein II m. Richard Rodgers
 "In the Middle of an Island" w.m. Ted Varnick & Nick Acquaviva
 "Island in the Sun" w.m. Harry Belafonte & Irving L. Burgie
 "It's Good to Be Alive" w.m. Bob Merrill
 "Ivy Rose" w.m. Al Hoffman & Dick Manning
 "Jailhouse Rock" w.m. Jerry Leiber and Mike Stoller
 "Jingle Bell Rock" w.m. Joseph Beal & James Boothe
 "Joey's Song" m. Joe Reisman
 "Just Between You and Me" w.m. Lee Cathy & Jack Keller
 "Just Born" w.m. Luther Dixon & Billy Dawn Smith
 "Let It Be Me" w.(Eng) Mann Curtis (Fr) Pierre Delanoë m. Gilbert Bécaud
 "Lida Rose" w.m. Meredith Willson
 "Liechtensteiner Polka" w.(Eng) Joseph Seener w.m. Edmund Koetscher & Rudi Lindt
 "Lips of Wine" w. Shirley Wolfe m. Sy Soloway
 "Little Biscuit" w. E. Y. Harburg m. Harold Arlen
 "The Little Blue Man" w.m. Fred Ebb & Paul Klein
 "Little Darlin' " w.m. Maurice Williams
 "Loving You" w.m. Jerry Leiber and Mike Stoller
 "Lucille" w.m. Richard Penniman & Albert Collins
 "Magic Moments" w. Hal David m. Burt Bacharach
 "Mama Look at Bubu" w.m. Lord Melody
 "Mean Woman Blues" w.m. Claude Demetrius
 "Mi Casa, Su Casa" w.m. Al Hoffman & Dick Manning
 "Moonlight Swim" w. Sylvia Dee m. Ben Weisman
 "My Heart Reminds Me" (aka "And That Reminds Me") w. (Eng) Al Stillman m. Camillo Bargoni
 "My Little Baby" w.m. Joe Shapiro and Lou Stallman
 "My Special Angel" w.m. Jimmy Duncan
 "Napoleon" w. E. Y. Harburg m. Harold Arlen
 "Oh Boy!" w.m. Sunny West, Norman Petty & Bill Tilghman
 "Oh, Lonesome Me" w.m. Don Gibson
 "Old Cape Cod" w.m. Claire Rothrock, Milt Yakus & Allan Jeffrey
 "One Hand, One Heart" w. Stephen Sondheim m. Leonard Bernstein
 "Party Doll" w.m. Jimmy Bowen & Buddy Knox
 "Passing Strangers" Mel Mitchell, Stanley Applebaum
 "Peggy Sue" w.m. Jerry Allison, Norman Petty & Buddy Holly
 "Pretend You Don't See Her" w.m. Steve Allen
 "Proceed with Caution" Wilson Stone
 "Promise Her Anything" w.m. Roy Alfred
 "A Pub with No Beer" w.m. Gordon Parsons
 "Put a Light in the Window" w. Rhoda Roberts m. Kenny Jacobson
 "Rainbow" w.m. Russ Hamilton
 "Raunchy" m. William E. Justis Jr & Sidney Manker
 "Reet Petite" T. Carlo, Berry Gordy
 "Remember You're Mine" Bernie Lowe, Kal Mann
 "Rock and Roll Music" w.m. Chuck Berry
 "Rock-A-Billy" w.m. Woody Harris & Eddie V. Deane
 "Sadder But Wiser Girl for Me" w.m. Meredith Willson
 "Santa, Bring My Baby Back (To Me)" w.m. Claude Demetrius & Aaron Schroeder
 "Sayonara" w.m. Irving Berlin
 "School Day" w.m. Chuck Berry
 "Searchin' " w.m. Jerry Leiber and Mike Stoller
 "Send for Me" w.m. Ollie Jones
 "Seventy-Six Trombones" w.m. Meredith Willson
 "She Was Only Seventeen" w.m. Marty Robbins
 "Shiralee" w.m. Tommy Steele
 "Short Fat Fanny" Larry Williams
 "Silhouettes" w.m. Frank Slay & Bob Crewe
 "Something's Coming" w. Stephen Sondheim m. Leonard Bernstein
 "Somewhere" w. Stephen Sondheim m. Leonard Bernstein. Introduced by Reri Grist in the musical West Side Story
 "The Song of Raintree County" w. Paul Francis Webster & Raymond Egan m. Richard Whiting
 "Song of the Clyde" w. R. Y Bell m. Ian Gourlay
 "Spooky Polka" – m. John Serry Sr.
 "The Story of My Life" w. Hal David m. Burt Bacharach
 "The Stroll" w.m. Nancy Lee & Clyde Otis
 "Tammy" w. Jay Livingston m. Ray Evans. Introduced by Debbie Reynolds in the film Tammy and the Bachelor
 "Teddy Bear" w.m. Kal Mann & Bernie Lowe. Introduced by Elvis Presley in the film Loving You
 "Tele Vee Shun" Stan Freberg
 "Ten Minutes Ago" w. Oscar Hammerstein II m. Richard Rodgers
 "That'll Be the Day" w.m. Buddy Holly, Norman Petty & Jerry Allison
 "Till" w.m. Carl Sigman, Charles Sananes & Pierre Buisson
 "Till There Was You" w.m. Meredith Willson. Introduced by Robert Preston and Barbara Cook in the musical The Music Man
 "Tonight" w. Stephen Sondheim & Leonard Bernstein m. Leonard Bernstein
 "Treat Me Nice" w.m. Jerry Leiber and Mike Stoller
 "Trouble (In River City)" w.m. Meredith Willson. Introduced by Robert Preston in the musical The Music Man.
 "The Twelfth of Never" adapt. (folk song) w. Paul Francis Webster m. Jerry Livingston
 "Twenty-six Miles" w.m. Bruce Bell & Glen Larson
 "A Very Special Love" w.m. Robert Allen
 "Wake Up Little Susie" w.m. Felice & Boudleaux Bryant
 "Walking Along" Sam Weiss, Winston Willis
 "White Silver Sands" w.m. Charles G. Matthews & Gladys Reinhardt
 "A White Sport Coat" w.m. Marty Robbins
 "Whole Lotta Shakin' Goin' On" w.m. Dave Williams & Sunny David
 "Whole Lotta Woman" w.m. Marvin Rainwater
 "Why Baby Why" w.m. Luther Dixon & Larry Harrison
 "Why Don't They Understand" Jack Fishman, Joe Henderson
 "Wild Is the Wind" w. Ned Washington m. Dimitri Tiomkin
 "Wind in the Willows" Wecht, Singer, Singer
 "Witchcraft" w. Carolyn Leigh m. Cy Coleman
 "Wonderful! Wonderful!" w. Ben Raleigh m. Sherman Edwards
 "Yellow Bird" w.m. Alan Bergman, Marilyn Keith & Norman Luboff
 "Yes Tonight, Josephine" w.m. Winfield Scott & Dorothy Goodman
 "You Need Hands" w.m. Roy Irwin

Classical music

Premieres

Compositions

 Hugo Alfvén – Den förlorade sonen (The Prodigal Son), R214
 Malcolm Arnold – Symphony No. 3
 Luciano Berio – Serenata I
 Ernest Bloch
Suite No. 3 for Solo Cello
Piano Quintet No. 2
 Pierre Boulez – Le Marteau sans maître (1953–55/1957)
 John Cage – Winter Music
 Aaron Copland – Orchestral Variations
 Pierre Gabaye – Boutade
 Henryk Górecki –
Sonata for two violins, Op. 10
Concerto for Five Instruments and String Quartet, Op. 11
 Jørgen Jersild – 3 Madrigali
 Wojciech Kilar – Lullabies, solo cantatas for soprano and seven instruments
 Giselher Klebe – Concerto for cello and orchestra
 Jan Klusák – Concerto grosso
 László Lajtha – Symphony No. 7, Revolution (A tribute to the Hungarian Revolution in 1956 against the Soviet suppression)
 Bohuslav Martinů – Romance z pampelišek, H. 364
 Toshiro Mayuzumi – Phonologie Symphonique
 Ennio Morricone – Concerto, for orchestra
 Per Nørgård – Piano Sonata No. 2, Op. 20
 Walter Piston – Viola Concerto
 Allan Pettersson – Concerto for String Orchestra No. 3
 Francis Poulenc – Flute Sonata, FP 164
 Hilding Rosenberg – String Quartets nos. 8 – 12
 Edmund Rubbra – Seventh Symphony
 John Serry Sr. – Reeds in a Rush
 Roger Sessions – Symphony No. 3
 Alfred Schnittke – Symphony No. 0
 Dmitri Shostakovich
Piano Concerto No. 2 in F major
Symphony No. 11 in G minor, Op. 103 "The Year 1905"
 Elie Siegmeister – Symphony No. 3
 Karlheinz Stockhausen – Gruppen for three orchestras (1955–57)
 Tōru Takemitsu – Requiem for Strings
 Vladimir Ussachevsky – Metamorphosis
 Galina Ustvolskaya – Piano Sonata No. 4
 Ralph Vaughan Williams
Blake Songs (10)
Symphony No. 9
 Heitor Villa-Lobos
Piano Concerto No. 3
String Quartet No. 17
Symphony No. 12
 William Walton – Partita for Orchestra
 Mieczysław Weinberg – Symphony No. 4
 Malcolm Williamson
 A Vision of Beasts and Gods, song cycle for high voice and piano
 Santiago de Espada, overture for orchestra
 Symphony No. 1 – Elevamini, for orchestra
 Iannis Xenakis – Achorripsis
 Bernd Alois Zimmermann
 Canto di speranza
 Die fromme Helene
 Omnia tempus habent

Opera
 John Eaton – Ma Barker
 Bohuslav Martinů – The Greek Passion
 Douglas Moore – Gallantry
 Ildebrando Pizzetti – Assassinio nella Cattedrale
 Francis Poulenc – Dialogues of the Carmelites (Dialogues des Carmelites)
 Heitor Villa-Lobos – Daughter of the Clouds

Jazz

Musical theatre
 Brigadoon (Alan Jay Lerner and Frederick Loewe) — Broadway revival
 Damn Yankees (Richard Adler and Jerry Ross) — London production
 Katharina Knie opened at the Staatstheater am Gärtnerplatz in Munich on January 20
 The Music Man (Meredith Willson) opened at the Majestic Theatre on Broadway on December 19, 1957, and ran for 1375 performances.
 New Girl in Town (George Abbott and Bob Merrill) Broadway production, opened at the 46th St. Theatre and ran for 431 performances
 West Side Story (Leonard Bernstein) — Broadway production, opened at the Winter Garden Theatre and ran for 732 performances
 Zuleika — London production, Saville Theatre

Musical films
 Funny Face starring Fred Astaire and Audrey Hepburn
 Les Girls starring Gene Kelly, Mitzi Gaynor and Kay Kendall
 Loving You released July 9 starring Elvis Presley.
 Mayabazar starring Savithri
 The Pajama Game starring Doris Day and John Raitt
 Pal Joey starring Frank Sinatra, Rita Hayworth and Kim Novak
 Pardesi, with music by Anil Biswas
 Silk Stockings, featuring Fred Astaire and Cyd Charisse

Births
 January 3 – Dave Dobbyn, New Zealand singer-songwriter, guitarist and producer
 January 4
Brian Roy Goble, Canadian singer-songwriter (Subhumans and The Skulls) (died 2014)
Patty Loveless, country singer
 January 23 – Earl Falconer, reggae bass guitarist and singer (UB40)
 January 27 – Janick Gers, heavy metal guitarist (Iron Maiden)
 February 2 – Tony Butler, rock bass guitarist (Big Country)
 February 19 – Falco, classical and rock musician (died 1998)
 February 27 – Adrian Smith, musician (Iron Maiden and Urchin)
 February 28
 Phil Gould, drummer (Level 42)
 Cindy Wilson, new wave singer (The B-52's)
 March 5 – Mark E. Smith, post-punk singer-songwriter (The Fall) (died 2018)
 March 12 – Marlon Jackson, vocalist (The Jackson 5)
 March 21 – John Whitfield, conductor
 March 26 – Paul Morley, music journalist
 April 2 – Mark Alburger, composer, conductor, music journalist
 April 12 – Vince Gill
 May 2 – Markus Stockhausen, trumpeter and composer
 May 10 – Sid Vicious, punk musician (Sex Pistols) (died 1979)
 May 18 – Michael Cretu, musician
 May 27 – Siouxsie Sioux, singer (Siouxsie and the Banshees)
 June 11 – Jamaaladeen Tacuma, free jazz bass guitarist
 June 14 – Maxi Jazz, singer-songwriter and rapper (Faithless) (died 2022)
 June 15 – Brad Gillis, American guitarist
 June 17
Phil Chevron, Irish singer-songwriter and guitarist (The Pogues)
Martin Dillon, American tenor and educator (died 2005)
 June 22 – Garry Gary Beers, new wave rock bass guitarist (INXS)
 June 24 – Astro (Terence Wilson), reggae singer-songwriter (UB40) (died 2021)
 June 26 – Patty Smyth, American singer-songwriter (Scandal)
 July 3
 Peter Breiner, composer
 Poly Styrene, punk musician
 July 30 – Christopher Miller, known as Rat Scabies, drummer
 August 2
Mojo Nixon, American singer-songwriter
Butch Vig, American drummer, songwriter and producer (Garbage and Spooner)
 August 18 – Ron Strykert, Men at Work
 August 21 – Budgie, drummer (Siouxsie and the Banshees)
 August 22 – Holly Dunn, country singer/songwriter (died 2016)
 August 31
 Gina Schock, The Go-Go's
 Glenn Tilbrook, vocalist (Squeeze)
 September 1
 Gloria Estefan, singer (Miami Sound Machine)
 Jon Moss, drummer (Culture Club)
 September 12 – Hans Zimmer, film score composer and music producer
 September 22
 Nick Cave, singer-songwriter
 Johnette Napolitano, Concrete Blonde
 October 3 – Tim Westwood, DJ
 October 5 – Lee Jay Thompson (Madness)
 October 7 – Michael W. Smith, contemporary Christian singer
 October 19 – Karl Wallinger (World Party)
 October 20 – Anouar Brahem, oud player and composer
 October 21
 Julian Cope, post-punk singer-songwriter and antiquarian
 Steve Lukather, rock guitarist (Toto)
 October 16 – Kelly Marie, disco singer
 October 28 – Stephen Morris (New Order)
 November 1 – Lyle Lovett, country musician
 November 5 – Mike Score (A Flock of Seagulls)
 November 8 – Porl Thompson (The Cure)
 November 20 – Hendrik Hofmeyr, composer
 November 24 – Chris Hayes, pop rock musician (Huey Lewis and the News)
 December 6 – Adrian Borland, post-punk musician The Sound (died 1999)
 December 6
Bob Drake, avant-garde musician
Jack Lee, bagpiper
 December 9
 Donny Osmond, singer (Osmonds)
 Steve Taylor, singer, record producer
 December 10 – Paul Hardcastle, composer and musician
 December 12 – Sheila E., singer-songwriter and percussionist
 December 20
 Anita Baker, R&B singer-songwriter
 Billy Bragg, singer-songwriter
 Anna Vissi, singer
 December 22 – Tsai Chin, singer
 December 25 – Shane MacGowan, Celtic punk singer (The Pogues)
 December 27 – Jerry Gaskill, American drummer
 date unknown
 Annette A. Aguilar, Latin jazz percussionist
 Charles Roland Berry, composer
 Kartik Seshadri, sitarist and composer

Deaths
 January – Gertie Gitana, music hall entertainer, 69
 January 16 – Arturo Toscanini, conductor, 89
 January 18 – George Girard, jazz trumpeter, 26 (cancer)
 February 7 – Rudolph Réti, pianist, composer and musicologist, 71
 February 16 – Josef Hofmann, pianist and composer, 81
 February 21
"Klondike" Kate Rockwell, vaudeville performer, 83
Marguerite Sylva, operatic mezzo-soprano, 81
 March 8 – Othmar Schoeck, composer, 70
 March 13 – Lena Ashwell, Forces entertainer, 84
 March 24 – Carson Robison, country music singer and songwriter, 66
 April 15 – Pedro Infante, actor and singer, 39 (air crash)
 May 2 – Tadeusz Kassern, composer, 53 (cancer)
 May 9 – Ezio Pinza, Italian singer and actor, 64
 May 12 – Marie Rappold, operatic soprano, 83
 June 5 – Frances Densmore, ethnomusicologist, 90
 June 6 – Kulyash Baiseitova, opera singer, 52
 June 12 – Jimmy Dorsey, jazz musician and big band leader, 53 (cancer)
 July 7 – Hiski Salomaa, folk singer and songwriter, 66
 July 9 – Alexander Goedicke, pianist and composer, 80
 July 16 – Serge Chaloff, saxophonist, 33 (cancer)
 August 4 – Ivan Zorman, poet and composer, 72
 August 28 – Erik Tuxen, conductor, composer and arranger, 55
 September 1 – Dennis Brain, horn virtuoso, 36 (car accident)
 September 11 – Petar Stojanović, violinist and composer, 80
 September 20 – Jean Sibelius, composer, 91
 October 14 – Natanael Berg, composer, 78
 October 20 – Jack Buchanan, Scottish singer, dancer, actor and director, 66
 October 23 – Abe Lyman, US bandleader, composer and drummer, 60
 November 4 – Joseph Canteloube, composer, 78
 November 29 – Erich Wolfgang Korngold, composer, 60
 November 30 – Beniamino Gigli, operatic tenor, 67
 December 19 – Abolhasan Saba, instrumentalist, 55
 December 20 – Walter Page, jazz musician, 57
 December 21 – Eric Coates, composer, 71
 Undated – Ustad Qasim, musician, 78–79

Awards

Eurovision Song Contest
 Eurovision Song Contest 1957

References

 
20th century in music
Music by year